Zhengzhou University, colloquially known in Chinese as Zhèngdà and abbreviated as ZZU is a public university located in Zhengzhou, Henan, China. Zhengzhou University is the largest university in China in terms of number of students (around 73,000 students).

Zhengzhou University was co-constructed by the Chinese Ministry of Education and the Government of Henan Province under the initiative of "One Province, One University". It has been recognized for receipt of huge development spending given its potential to become a reputed seat of higher learning. ZZU was included in "Project 211" by the Chinese Ministry of Education which aimed at transforming promising universities into "Key National Universities". The "Project 211" was later on replaced with a more ambitious and comprehensive initiative of tertiary education "Double First-Class University Plan" with an intent to develop elite Chinese universities and their disciplines as topmost institutions of the world by the end of 2050. ZZU is included in this project as well.

Zhengzhou University has been ranked among top 300 global universities by Academic Ranking of World Universities 2022, and 385th globally and 75th in Asia as of 2022 by the US News & World Report Best Global University Ranking.

History

Merger of three universities 
Originally established in 1956, Zhengzhou University was restructured by the merger of three universities i.e., Zhengzhou University, Henan Medical University, and Zhengzhou University of Technology on July 10, 2000. The purpose of this re-establishment was to create a center of top-notch learning covering a huge range of academic disciplines, equipped with excellent research facilities so as to revolutionize higher education in Central China in general and Henan Province in particular. Since its re-establishment, Zhengzhou University has received more attention by the Chinese Ministry of Education and the People's Government of Henan Province in terms of governmental support, finances, inter institutional cooperation and research collaboration.

History before merger 

Henan Medical University dates back to the medical education in National Fifth Sun Yat-Sen University built in 1928 (the predecessor of National Henan University founded in 1942). This national university moved into Zhengzhou in 1952 and established Henan Medical College (the first batch authorized to confer doctoral degrees) which was the fore running of the higher medical education in Henan province.

Zhengzhou University is the first comprehensive university established by the State Council of Chinese Government in 1954. According to the State Council, a group of faculty members from Shandong University, Peking University, Jilin University and Northeast University moved to Zhengzhou. The Zhengzhou University was established by these professors in 1954. The university was admitted into Project 211 in 1996.

Zhengzhou University of Technology as a National Key University under the direct administration of the Ministry of Chemical Industry of China, it was founded in 1963.

Campus 

Zhengzhou University now has four campuses covering 1070 acres land across Zhengzhou City. The main campus covers 799 acres of land on Science Avenue and Changchun Road in North-West section of Zhengzhou City. It is one of the most beautiful campuses in China with a construction cost of more than two billion Yuan. Majority of schools and faculties are located at main campus.

The east campus is the campus of previous Henan Medical University in the city center between Zhongyuan Road and Jianshe Road. The clinical stage of medical education is held on this campus. The First Affiliated Hospital of Zhengzhou University, with more than 10,000 sickbeds, is the largest hospital in the world.

The south campus is the campus of previous Zhengzhou University in the city center area of Daxue Road, while the north campus is the campus of previous Zhengzhou University of Technology in the city center of Wenhua Road.

Staff, Programs, Students 
After years of balanced development, Zhengzhou University now is a multi-discipline institution with 12 fields, such as science, engineering, medicine, literature, history, philosophy, law, economics, management science, pedagogy, agriculture and arts. Currently there are six national key disciplines, condensed matter physics, materials processing engineering, history of ancient China, organic chemistry, chemical technology, pathology and pathophysiology; 7 disciplines ranked top 1% in ESI globally; 21 first-level disciplines are authorized to confer doctoral degrees, 3 independent second-level disciplines to confer doctoral degrees, 55 first-level disciplines to confer master's degrees, as well as 24 post-doctoral research stations. There are 51 Schools and departments as well as 9 affiliated hospitals in Zhengzhou University. The number of staff is over 6,000, 4000 academic members, 37 academicians of the Chinese Academy of Science and Engineering (15 full-time, 22 part-time and 4 oversea), 747 professors, and 1,600 associate professors. In year 2020, there are around 51,000 undergraduate students, 19,000 graduate students and 2,600 international students studying in Zhengzhou University.

Schools 

There exist 51 schools or departments in Zhengzhou University, ranging from art and literature to social and natural science and engineering.

Medicine Schools and Departments

Humanities and Social Science Schools and Departments

Science and Engineering Schools

Rankings 
Zhengzhou University has been ranked among top 300 global universities by Academic Ranking of World Universities 2022, and 385th globally and 75th in Asia as of 2022 by the US News & World Report Best Global University Ranking. 

Times Higher Education 2023 has ranked ZZU in 601-800 best global universities. CWTS Ranking 2022 of Leiden University ranked ZZU as 79th best global university  whereas NTU World Universities Ranking 2021 ranked it 134. The QS Asia Top Universities 2022 ranked it among 220 best universities of Asia.

Research 

Featured with a solid scientific research foundation, Zhengzhou University now owns more than 330 scientific research institutions of all levels/kinds, among which are 1 National Engineering Research Center, 1 National Technology Research Promotion Center, 1 National Chemical Safety Engineering Technology Center, 1 National Research Center for Safety Evaluation of Drugs, 2 National Drug Clinical Research Bases, 3 MOE Key Labs, 2 MOE Engineering Research Center, 1 Key Research Base of College Humanities and Social Sciences sponsored by the MOE and the Province, 1 Sports Culture Research Base under the Sports Culture Development Research Center of the State Sports General Administration, 1 National Intellectual Property Training Base, 6 Henan Provincial Collaborative Innovation Centers; Provincial Key Labs, Engineering Technology Research Centers, International United Labs, Key Humanities and Social Science Research Bases, Provincial Universities and Colleges Key Principles Open Labs, Engineering Technology Research Centers, State Key Laboratory Cultivation Bases total up to 104, and provincial key scientific and research institutions total up to 125, which indicates a strong capability on basic research, application research and development of science and technology. With a total construction area of 84,000sqm, its library contains a collection of books of more than 7.971 million. The university has its own publishing house and issues 14 academic journals.

Scholarship programs 

As the largest university in China, Zhengzhou University provides millions of US dollars to sponsor hundreds of applicants with full scholarship and partial scholarship to pursue their degree non-degree study in Zhengzhou University each year. This is the only Chinese university with so many scholarship seats. In 2018, about 500 newly recruited students were sponsored by various types of scholarship, such as President Scholarship, Henan Government Scholarship, Chinese Government Scholarship, Confucius Scholarship. These scholarships usually covers:

 Majority part of tuition for bachelor program.
 Whole tuition for master program.
 Tuition, accommodation and living allowance for doctor program.

School of International Education 
The School of International Education (SIE) is in charge of international education of Zhengzhou University. There are approximately 1,700 overseas students from 70 countries/areas, among them 80% are degree students, more than 10% are supported by full scholarship. SIE also houses a Chinese language education base (accredited by the Overseas Chinese Affairs Office of State Council) and a Chinese international promotion base of Henan Province offering a number of Chinese language programs from short term training to bachelor's and master's degree. SIE runs a Confucius School jointly with Indian Vellore Institute of Technology and a Confucius class with St Mary School in USA. Zhengzhou university in collaboration with MEDVIZZ - CEO, Dr G Bhanu Prakash to train all medical fraternities for USMLE, PLAB AND FMGE in the campus itself.

Zhengzhou University is dedicated to conducting various forms cooperation and exchanges with famous universities abroad, absorbing advanced education programs and striving to achieve the objective of internationalization.

Notable alumni
Zhang Hongjiang, a Chinese computer scientist, international member of National Academy of Engineering, and executive. He served as CEO of Kingsoft, managing director of Microsoft Advanced Technology Center (ATC) and chief technology officer (CTO) of Microsoft China Research and Development Group (CRD).
Chen Quanguo, the current Communist Party Secretary of Xinjiang and the former Party Committee Secretary of Tibet Autonomous Region

Notable faculty 

 Liang Jun, teacher and women's rights activist

See also 
Shengda College
Sias International University

References

External links 
 Official website of Zhengzhou University 
 Official website of School of International Education Zhengzhou University 
 A Brief Introduction to Zhengzhou University 

 
Universities in China with English-medium medical schools
Universities and colleges in Zhengzhou
Project 211
Educational institutions established in 1956
1956 establishments in China